John III, Duke of Cleves and Count of Mark (German: Johann III der Friedfertige; 10 November 1490 – 6 February 1539), known as John the Peaceful, was the Lord of Ravensberg, Count of Marck, and founder of the United Duchies of Jülich-Cleves-Berg.

Life 
John was born on 10 November 1490, as the son of John II, Duke of Cleves, and Mathilde of Hesse. In 1510, at the age of 19, John married Duchess Maria of Jülich-Berg, daughter of Duke William IV of Jülich-Berg and Sibylle of Brandenburg, who became heiress to her father's estates Jülich, Berg and Ravensberg.

John became ruler of the United Duchies of Jülich-Cleves-Berg in 1521, and Lord of Ravensberg in 1528. In fact, the real influence at the court of Cleves was Erasmus. Many of his men were friends and followers of the Dutch scholar and theologian. In 1532 John wrote up a list of church regulations(Kirchenordnung), which expressed numerous ideas of Erasmus. 

John had an instinct for balance as was shown when he married his eldest daughter Sybille to the Elector of Saxony, John Frederick. John Frederick would go on to later head the Schmalkaldic League. In many ways, John of Cleves' court was ideal for raising a queen. It was fundamentally liberal, but serious-minded, theologically inclined, and profoundly Erasmian. It was from this court that his daughter Anna would be raised. Anna would go on to marry King Henry VIII of England, as his fourth wife.

Family

John and his wife Duchess Maria of Jülich-Berg had the following children:

 Sybille (17 January 1512 – 21 February 1554); married Elector John Frederick of Saxony, head of the Protestant Confederation of Germany, "Champion of the Reformation". Had issue.
 Anna (28 June 1515 – 16 July 1557); who was briefly married to King Henry VIII of England, as his fourth wife. No issue.
 William (28 July 1516 – 5 January 1592); married Archduchess Maria, daughter of Emperor Ferdinand I, and had issue.
Amalia (17 October 1517 – 1 March 1586); became Princess of the House of La Marck.

Ancestry

References

Sources

1490 births
1539 deaths
Dukes of Cleves
House of La Marck
Dukes of Berg
Counts of the Mark